Weiwen Miao is a Chinese-American statistician, statistics educator, and scholar of legal statistics and nonparametric statistics. She is a professor of mathematics and statistics at Haverford College.

Education and career
Miao has a bachelor's degree in mathematics from Peking University. She went to Tufts University for graduate study in probability theory and statistics, earning a master's degree and a Ph.D. there. Her 1995 doctoral dissertation, Maximum Likelihood Estimation for Exponential Families, was supervised by Marjorie Hahn.

After teaching statistics at Mount Holyoke College and Colby College, and becoming an associate professor at Macalester College, she moved to Haverford College in 2007.

Recognition
Miao was named a Fellow of the American Statistical Association in 2021.

References

External links
Home page

Year of birth missing (living people)
Living people
American statisticians
American women statisticians
Chinese statisticians
Chinese women mathematicians
Peking University alumni
Tufts University School of Arts and Sciences alumni
Mount Holyoke College faculty
Colby College faculty
Macalester College faculty
Haverford College faculty
Fellows of the American Statistical Association
21st-century American women